Ethmia maculata is a moth in the family Depressariidae. It is found in China and Taiwan.

The larvae feed on Ehretia dicksonii.

References

Moths described in 1967
maculata